Yeongdeungpo station (Station 139) is a ground-level railway station in Seoul, South Korea. The station is located in Yeongdeungpo Dong, Yeongdeungpo-gu, and is a stop on the Gyeongbu Line, Honam Line and Seoul Subway Line 1.  The station is integrated into the Yeongdeungpo Lotte Department Store. Located in the station are Lotteria, Dunkin' Donuts, Krispy Kreme, and KFC.

History

Yeongdeungpo station opened on September 18, 1899, as a stop on the Gyeongin Line.  On April 1, 1936, trains on the Gyeongbu Line began calling here.  The station's name was changed to "Namgyeongseong" (South Gyeongseong, Gyeongseong being the then name of Seoul), but it reverted to its current name on April 1, 1943, and on January 1, 1949, the station was given "Level 5" in its classification of importance.  The station building was destroyed on June 30, 1950, five days after the beginning of the Korean War, and a new building was not completed until January 12, 1965.  On February 1, 1968, the station was deemed to be of "Level 4" importance.  Trains on the Seoul Subway began running through Yeongdeungpo on August 15, 1974.  The station stopped handling freight on May 1, 2006.

Services

The first train on weekdays (not including national holidays) is at 5.04 a.m. for northbound and 5.05 a.m. for southbound, while the last is at 00.04 a.m. for northbound and 00.24 a.m. for southbound.  Travel time to Suwon takes 45 minutes, while travel time to Incheon takes 53 minutes.

All express trains, except for the Seoul - Cheonan Express, stop here, and the Gwangmyeong Shuttle stops here. In addition, trains to Incheon depart twice a day. In addition, it has become a gathering point for almost all Mugunghwa, Saemaeul, and KTX service systems.

Vicinity

The following places may be accessed from the exits as listed below.
Exit 1 : Lotte Department Store, Yeongdeungpo market, Shinsegae department store
Exit 2 : Singil Dong; "rear exit"
Exit 3 : Yeongdeungpo tax office, Yeongdeungpo Post Office, Lotte Department Store
Exit 4 : Yeongdeungpo fire station

References

Seoul Metropolitan Subway stations
Railway stations opened in 1899
Railway stations in Seoul
Metro stations in Yeongdeungpo District
Korea Train Express stations
앙사나 레지던스 여의도 서울